Tooh may refer to:

"Tooh" (song), composed by Vishal–Shekhar, 2013 
 Toóh, a community of Mocochá Municipality, Yucatán, Mexico
 Trip out of hole (TOOH), an abbreviation in oil and gas exploration and production